Eastern European Time (EET) is one of the names of UTC+02:00 time zone, 2 hours ahead of Coordinated Universal Time. The zone uses daylight saving time, so that it uses UTC+03:00 during the summer.

A number of African countries use UTC+02:00 all year long, where it is called Central Africa Time (CAT), although Egypt and Libya also use the term Eastern European Time.

The most populous city in the Eastern European Time zone is Cairo, with the most populous EET city in Europe being Athens.

Usage 
The following countries, parts of countries, and territories use Eastern European Time all year round:

 Egypt, since 21 April 2015; used EEST (UTC+02:00; UTC+03:00 with daylight saving time) from 1988–2010 and 16 May–26 September 2014. See also Egypt Standard Time.
 Kaliningrad Oblast (Russia), since 26 October 2014; also used EET in years 1945 and 1991–2011. See also Kaliningrad Time.
 Libya, since 27 October 2013; switched from Central European Time, which was used in 2012. Used year-round EET from 1980–1981, 1990–1996 and 1998–2012.

The following countries, parts of countries, and territories use Eastern European Time during the winter only:

 Bulgaria, since 1894, except between 1942 and 1945
 Estonia, in years 1921–40 and since 1990
 Finland, since 1921
 Greece, since 1916
 Israel, since 1948 (see also Israel Standard Time)
 Jordan
 Latvia, in years 1926–40 and since 1990
 Lebanon
 Lithuania, in 1920–40 and since 1990 with break 1998–1999
 Moldova, in years 1918–40, 1941–44 and since 1991
 Including Transnistria
 Palestine (see also Palestine Standard Time)
 Romania
 Syria
 Ukraine, in years 1922–30 and since 1990

The following countries, parts of countries, and territories used Eastern European Time in the past:

 Moscow used EET in years 1922–30 and 1991–92. 
 Belarus, in years 1922–30 and 1990–2011
 In Poland, this time was used in years 1919–22.
 Crimea used EET as part of Ukraine between 1991–1994 and 1996–2014 and started using Moscow Time due to the annexation of Crimea by the Russian Federation in 2014.
 Turkey, used EET in years 1910-1978 and re-used it again in years 1985–2016.

Sometimes, due to its use on Microsoft Windows, FLE Standard Time (for Finland, Lithuania, Estonia, or sometimes Finland, Latvia, Estonia) or GTB Standard Time (for Greece, Turkey, Bulgaria) are used to refer to Eastern European Time.

Anomalies
Since political, in addition to purely geographical, criteria are used in the drawing of time zones, it follows that time zones do not precisely adhere to meridian lines. The EET (UTC+02:00) time zone, were it drawn by purely geographical terms, would consist of exactly the area between meridians 22°30' E and 37°30' E. As a result, there are European locales that despite lying in an area with a "physical" UTC+02:00 time, are in another time zone; likewise, there are European areas that have gone for UTC+02:00, even though their "physical" time zone is different from that. Following is a list of such anomalies:

Areas located outside UTC+02:00 longitudes using Eastern European Time (UTC+02:00) time

Areas west of 22°30' E ("physical" UTC+01:00) that use UTC+02:00 
 The westernmost part of Greece, including the cities of Patras and Ioannina, and the Ionian Islands
 The very westernmost parts of the Bulgarian provinces of Vidin and Kyustendil
 The westernmost part of Romania, including most of the area of the counties of Caraș-Severin, Timiș (capital Timișoara), Arad, and Bihor, as well as the westernmost tips of the counties of Mehedinți and Satu Mare
 The extreme westernmost tip of Ukraine, near the border with Hungary and Slovakia, at the Ukrainian Transcarpathian Oblast (Zakarpattia Oblast), essentially comprising the city of Uzhhorod and its environs
 Most of the Kaliningrad Oblast, including the cities of Kaliningrad and Baltiysk
 Western Lithuania, including the cities of Klaipėda, Tauragė, and Telšiai
 Western Latvia, including the cities of Liepāja and Ventspils
 The westernmost parts of the Estonian islands of Saaremaa and Hiiumaa, including the capital of the Saare County, Kuressaare
 The southwestern coast of Finland, including the city of Turku; also the Åland islands (of Finnish jurisdiction) – the Åland islands are the westernmost locale applying EET in the whole of Europe
Most of Libya including the capital Tripoli

Areas east of 37°30' E ("physical" UTC+03:00) that use UTC+02:00

 Eastern parts of Ukraine, including the city of Mariupol'

Areas located within UTC+02:00 longitudes (22°30' E – 37°30' E) using other time zones

Areas that use UTC+01:00 
These areas have sunrises and sunsets at least half an hour earlier than places on the UTC+01:00 meridian.

The easternmost part of North Macedonia, including the city of Strumica.
The absolutely easternmost part of Serbia, in the Pirot District, including the city of Pirot.
The extreme easternmost tips of Hungary and Slovakia, bordering to the north and south respectively the Ukrainian Transcarpathian Oblast (Zakarpattia Oblast), a bit to the east of the Vásárosnamény, Hungary – Uzhhorod, Ukraine (both at 22°18' E) line
The easternmost part of Poland, including the cities of Lublin and Białystok
The extreme northeast of Sweden, in the Norrbotten province, including the cities of Kalix and Haparanda
The northeast of Norway, lying north of Finland, roughly coinciding with the county of Finnmark. The easternmost town in Norway, Vardø, lies at 30°51' E, which is located east of even of the central meridian of UTC+02:00, i.e. east of Istanbul and Alexandria. The Norwegian-Russian border and Belarus–Poland border are the only places where CET (UTC+1/+2) borders Moscow time (UTC+03:00), resulting in a one (or two in winter) hour time change when crossing that border. There is a "tri-zone" point (where UTC+01:00, UTC+02:00, and UTC+03:00 meet) at the Norway-Finland-Russia tripoint, near the town of Rayakoski.

Areas that use UTC+03:00 
  Belarus is located between 23°11′E and 32°47′E and is thus fully located with the physical UTC+02:00 area, but it uses UTC+03:00 year around.
  Practically all European Russia west of Moscow (except Kaliningrad Oblast); this includes the chunk of land from Murmansk all the way south to Belgorod, including the cities of St. Petersburg, Novgorod, and Pskov, to name only a few. (The westernmost point of contiguous Russia, near Lavry, Pskov Oblast, 27°19' E, is the westernmost point in European Russia where UTC+03:00 is applied.) This also includes the city of Anapa, at the westernmost tip of the Krasnodar Krai near the entrance to the Sea of Azov, at 37°22' E.
  Parts of western Syria, including the capital Damascus
  Most of Jordan, including the capital Amman
  Western half of Turkey, including the capital Ankara and the most populous city Istanbul

Tripoints and borders between zones 
 The Norway–Russia–Finland "tri-zone" point at Muotkavaara (see Central European Time) is surrounded by three different times in winter, two in summer. It had three time zones year-around before 2014.
 Two of the four tripoints of Belarus and the tripoint of the Kaliningrad Region are surrounded by three different times in winter.

Major metropolitan areas 
Winter only
Aleppo, Syria
Amman, Jordan
Athens, Greece
Beirut, Lebanon
Brașov, Romania
Bucharest, Romania
Chișinău, Moldova
Cluj-Napoca, Romania
Constanța, Romania
Damascus, Syria
Daugavpils, Latvia
Dnipro, Ukraine
Gaza, Palestine
Helsinki, Finland
Iași, Romania
Jerusalem, Israel
Kaunas, Lithuania
Kharkiv, Ukraine
Kyiv, Ukraine
Nicosia, Cyprus
Odessa, Ukraine
Oradea, Romania
Oulu, Finland
Plovdiv, Bulgaria
Ramallah, Palestine
Riga, Latvia
Sofia, Bulgaria
Tallinn, Estonia
Tampere, Finland
Tel Aviv, Israel
Thessaloniki, Greece
Timișoara, Romania
Turku, Finland
Varna, Bulgaria
Vilnius, Lithuania

Year round
Alexandria, Egypt
Benghazi, Libya
Cairo, Egypt
Giza, Egypt
Kaliningrad, Russia
Port Said, Egypt
Tripoli, Libya

References

Time zones
Time in Europe
Geography of Eastern Europe